Mauro Gioia (born 4 May 1966) is a Neapolitan singer and director.

Songs
His last album was “Rendez-vous Chez Nino Rota”, in which he performed the legendary Milanese composer's duets with Ute Lemper, Catherine Ringer, Sharleen Spiteri, Maria de Medeiros, Adriana Calcanhotto, Martirio, and Susana Rinaldi.

Documentary
While working on the Nino Rota recordings, Gioia made his first documentary, La visita meravigliosa (The Wonderful Visit). The film follows a road trip in which the protagonist—Nino Rota’s nephew—explores the Italian peninsula in an old camper in search of his uncle's friends, and in the process pieces together a personal portrait of the great composer.

References

1966 births
Living people
Musicians from Naples
Italian male singers